Isidor Siegfried Lissner (1832 – 22 July 1902) was a politician in Queensland, Australia. He was a Member of the Queensland Legislative Assembly.

Early life
Lissner was born in Posen, Prussia, the son of Siegfried Lissner and Julia Gluckmann.

Mining
He emigrated in 1856 to Victoria (Australia), where, after a varied experience on the gold diggings, he went to New Zealand and subsequently to Queensland, where he first settled at Ravenswood, Queensland and then moved to Charters Towers. Lissner came to England with Mr. Black in 1887 as the representative of the Charters Towers miners to assist Harold Finch-Hatton in pressing the question of North Queensland Separation on the attention of the Home Government.

Politics
Lissner was member for Kennedy from 5 October 1883 to 13 May 1893, (Secretary for Mines and Public Works 27 March 1893 to 25 May 1893) and member for Cairns from 4 April 1896 to 11 March 1899.

Later life
Lissner died in 1902 and was buried in Toowong Cemetery.

The heritage-listed Lissner Park in Charters Towers is named after him.

References

1832 births
1902 deaths
Members of the Queensland Legislative Assembly
Burials at Toowong Cemetery
19th-century Australian politicians
German emigrants to Australia